General elections were held in Liechtenstein on 1 and 3 February 1974. The result was a victory for the Progressive Citizens' Party, which won 8 of the 15 seats in the Landtag. Voter turnout was 95.3%, although only male citizens were allowed to vote. This was the last election contested by the Christian Social Party.

Results

References

Liechtenstein
1974 in Liechtenstein
Elections in Liechtenstein
February 1974 events in Europe